A megaphone is a portable funnel-shaped device used to amplify a person's voice or other sounds.

Megaphone could also mean:

 Megaphone (podcasting), a podcasting technology company, formerly Panoply Media
 Megaphone (band), rock band from Orlando, Florida
 Megaphone desktop tool, the pro-Israel lobbying software tool
 Megaphone (molecule), cytotoxic neolignan from Aniba megaphylla
 MegaFon, a Russian mobile phone operator
 Das Megaphon, an Austrian street newspaper